Murray Commins (born 2 January 1997) is a South African cricketer. He made his first-class debut for South Western Districts in the 2016–17 Sunfoil 3-Day Cup on 13 October 2016. He made his List A debut for South Western Districts in the 2016–17 CSA Provincial One-Day Challenge on 16 October 2016. He made his Twenty20 debut for South Western Districts in the 2017 Africa T20 Cup on 25 August 2017.

Since 2019, Commins has played domestic cricket in Ireland. Ahead of the 2021 season, Commins signed with Munster Reds.

International career 
Commins made his ODI debut against Zimbabwe on 21 January 2023.

References

External links
 

1997 births
Living people
South African cricketers
Boland cricketers
South Western Districts cricketers
Northern Knights cricketers
Munster Reds cricketers
Cricketers from Cape Town